Livia Maïté Peng (born March 14, 2002, in Chur) is a Swiss footballer who plays for FC Zürich and the Switzerland national team.

Career

Club 
When she was given goalie gloves for Christmas at the age of eight, Livia Peng discovered her passion for the goalkeeping position in football. After starting at FC Ems, she was accepted into the South East Switzerland team with young men and was supported there by coach Romano Cabalzar from 2014 to 2019.

From July 2017 she was employed by FC Zürich. In August 2019, Livia Peng was nominated as first-choice goalkeeper. As an FCZ player, Peng made six appearances in the UEFA Champions League.

After a successful 2021/22 season with two titles, she signed a professional contract with Gothenburg club BK Häcken in Sweden's Damallsvenskan league.

National Team 
At age 15, Peng got into the junior national team. Until 2021 she played in various youth national teams. She was called up to the senior national team for the first time in November 2020, behind Gaëlle Thalmann and Seraina Friedli. She was in the squad for the European Championship finals in England in the summer of 2022. On 11 November 2022, she was in goal during the first half of a friendly against Denmark, but that game was only counted as an unofficial friendly as more than six substitutions were made.

Achievements 

 Swiss Championship: 2019, 2022
 Swiss Cup: 2019, 2022

External links 

 Livia Peng in the soccerdonna.de database
 Livia Peng's website

References 

Switzerland women's international footballers
BK Häcken FF players
FC Zürich Frauen players
2002 births
Association football goalkeepers
Women's association football goalkeepers
Swiss women's footballers
Living people
Switzerland youth international footballers